The Heart of Edna Leslie is an American silent film produced by Kalem Company and could be directed by Sidney Olcott with Gene Gauntier and Alice Joyce in the leading roles.

Cast
 Gene Gauntier  
 Alice Joyce

References
American Film Institute Catalog

External links

 The Heart of Edna website dedicated to Sidney Olcott

1910 films
Silent American drama films
American silent short films
Films directed by Sidney Olcott
1910 short films
1910 drama films
American black-and-white films
1910s American films